The Italian general election of 2008 took place on 13–14 April 2008.

The People of Freedom was the largest party in Sardinia with 42.4%, while the Democratic Party came second with 36.2%.

Results

Chamber of Deputies
|-
|- bgcolor="#E9E9E9"
!rowspan="1" align="left" valign="top"|Coalitions leaders
!rowspan="1" align="center" valign="top"|votes
!rowspan="1" align="center" valign="top"|votes (%)
!rowspan="1" align="center" valign="top"|seats
!rowspan="1" align="left" valign="top"|Parties
!rowspan="1" align="center" valign="top"|votes
!rowspan="1" align="center" valign="top"|votes (%)
!rowspan="1" align="center" valign="top"|seats
|-
!rowspan="2" align="left" valign="top"|Silvio Berlusconi
|rowspan="2" valign="top"|421,420
|rowspan="2" valign="top"|43.1
|rowspan="2" valign="top"|9

|align="left"|The People of Freedom
|valign="top"|415,252
|valign="top"|42.4
|valign="top"|9
|-
|align="left"|Movement for Autonomy
|valign="top"|6,168
|valign="top"|0.6
|valign="top"|-

|-
!rowspan="2" align="left" valign="top"|Walter Veltroni
|rowspan="2" valign="top"|393,078
|rowspan="2" valign="top"|40.2
|rowspan="2" valign="top"|8

|align="left"|Democratic Party
|valign="top"|354,212
|valign="top"|36.2
|valign="top"|7
|-
|align="left"|Italy of Values
|valign="top"|38,866
|valign="top"|4.0
|valign="top"|1

|-
!rowspan="1" align="left" valign="top"|Pier Ferdinando Casini
|rowspan="1" valign="top"|54,665
|rowspan="1" valign="top"|5.6
|rowspan="1" valign="top"|1

|align="left"|Union of the Centre
|valign="top"|54,665
|valign="top"|5.6
|valign="top"|1

|-
!rowspan="1" align="left" valign="top"|Fausto Bertinotti
|rowspan="1" valign="top"|35,097
|rowspan="1" valign="top"|3.6
|rowspan="1" valign="top"|-

|align="left"|The Left – The Rainbow
|valign="top"|35,097
|valign="top"|3.6
|valign="top"|-

|-
!rowspan="1" align="left" valign="top"|Enrico Boselli
|rowspan="1" valign="top"|15,202
|rowspan="1" valign="top"|1.5
|rowspan="1" valign="top"|-

|align="left"|Socialist Party
|valign="top"|15,202
|valign="top"|1.5
|valign="top"|-

|-
!rowspan="1" align="left" valign="top"|Daniela Santanché
|rowspan="1" valign="top"|15,081
|rowspan="1" valign="top"|1.5
|rowspan="1" valign="top"|-

|align="left"|The Right–Tricolour Flame
|valign="top"|15,081
|valign="top"|1.5
|valign="top"|-

|-
!rowspan="1" align="left" valign="top"|Giacomo Sanna
|rowspan="1" valign="top"|14,856
|rowspan="1" valign="top"|1.5
|rowspan="1" valign="top"|-

|align="left"|Sardinian Action Party
|valign="top"|14,856
|valign="top"|1.5
|valign="top"|-

|-
!rowspan="1" align="left" valign="top"|Bustianu Cumpostu
|rowspan="1" valign="top"|7,182
|rowspan="1" valign="top"|0.7
|rowspan="1" valign="top"|-

|align="left"|Sardinia Nation
|valign="top"|7,182
|valign="top"|0.7
|valign="top"|-

|-
!rowspan="1" align="left" valign="top"|Others
|rowspan="1" valign="top"|21,863
|rowspan="1" valign="top"|1.5
|rowspan="1" valign="top"|-

|align="left"|Others
|valign="top"|21,863
|valign="top"|1.5
|valign="top"|-

|-
|- bgcolor="#E9E9E9"
!rowspan="1" align="left" valign="top"|Total coalitions
!rowspan="1" align="right" valign="top"|978,444
!rowspan="1" align="right" valign="top"|100.0
!rowspan="1" align="right" valign="top"|18
!rowspan="1" align="left" valign="top"|Total parties
!rowspan="1" align="right" valign="top"|978,444
!rowspan="1" align="right" valign="top"|100.0
!rowspan="1" align="right" valign="top"|18
|}
Source: Ministry of the Interior

Senate

|-
|- bgcolor="#E9E9E9"
!rowspan="1" align="left" valign="top"|Coalitions leaders
!rowspan="1" align="center" valign="top"|votes
!rowspan="1" align="center" valign="top"|votes (%)
!rowspan="1" align="center" valign="top"|seats
!rowspan="1" align="left" valign="top"|Parties
!rowspan="1" align="center" valign="top"|votes
!rowspan="1" align="center" valign="top"|votes (%)
!rowspan="1" align="center" valign="top"|seats
|-
!rowspan="2" align="left" valign="top"|Silvio Berlusconi
|rowspan="2" valign="top"|390,076
|rowspan="2" valign="top"|43.7
|rowspan="2" valign="top"|5

|align="left"|The People of Freedom
|valign="top"|384,950
|valign="top"|43.2
|valign="top"|5
|-
|align="left"|Movement for Autonomy
|valign="top"|5,126
|valign="top"|0.6
|valign="top"|-

|-
!rowspan="2" align="left" valign="top"|Walter Veltroni
|rowspan="2" valign="top"|360,485
|rowspan="2" valign="top"|40.4
|rowspan="2" valign="top"|4

|align="left"|Democratic Party
|valign="top"|325,919
|valign="top"|36.6
|valign="top"|4
|-
|align="left"|Italy of Values
|valign="top"|34,566
|valign="top"|3.9
|valign="top"|-

|-
!rowspan="1" align="left" valign="top"|Pier Ferdinando Casini
|rowspan="1" valign="top"|49,624
|rowspan="1" valign="top"|5.6
|rowspan="1" valign="top"|-

|align="left"|Union of the Centre
|valign="top"|49,624
|valign="top"|5.6
|valign="top"|-

|-
!rowspan="1" align="left" valign="top"|Fausto Bertinotti
|rowspan="1" valign="top"|29,628
|rowspan="1" valign="top"|3.3
|rowspan="1" valign="top"|-

|align="left"|The Left – The Rainbow
|valign="top"|29,628
|valign="top"|3.3
|valign="top"|-

|-
!rowspan="1" align="left" valign="top"|Giacomo Sanna
|rowspan="1" valign="top"|15,280
|rowspan="1" valign="top"|1.7
|rowspan="1" valign="top"|-

|align="left"|Sardinian Action Party
|valign="top"|15,280
|valign="top"|1.7
|valign="top"|-

|-
!rowspan="1" align="left" valign="top"|Enrico Boselli
|rowspan="1" valign="top"|12,728
|rowspan="1" valign="top"|1.4
|rowspan="1" valign="top"|-

|align="left"|Socialist Party
|valign="top"|12,728
|valign="top"|1.4
|valign="top"|-

|-
!rowspan="1" align="left" valign="top"|Daniela Santanché
|rowspan="1" valign="top"|11,073
|rowspan="1" valign="top"|1.2
|rowspan="1" valign="top"|-

|align="left"|The Right–Tricolour Flame
|valign="top"|11,073
|valign="top"|1.2
|valign="top"|-

|-
!rowspan="1" align="left" valign="top"|Bustianu Cumpostu
|rowspan="1" valign="top"|6,972
|rowspan="1" valign="top"|0.8
|rowspan="1" valign="top"|-

|align="left"|Sardinia Nation
|valign="top"|6,972
|valign="top"|0.8
|valign="top"|-

|-
!rowspan="1" align="left" valign="top"|Others
|rowspan="1" valign="top"|15,855
|rowspan="1" valign="top"|1.8
|rowspan="1" valign="top"|-

|align="left"|Others
|valign="top"|18,855
|valign="top"|1.8
|valign="top"|-

|-
|- bgcolor="#E9E9E9"
!rowspan="1" align="left" valign="top"|Total coalitions
!rowspan="1" align="right" valign="top"|891,721
!rowspan="1" align="right" valign="top"|100.0
!rowspan="1" align="right" valign="top"|9
!rowspan="1" align="left" valign="top"|Total parties
!rowspan="1" align="right" valign="top"|891,721
!rowspan="1" align="right" valign="top"|100.0
!rowspan="1" align="right" valign="top"|9
|}
Source: Ministry of the Interior

Elections in Sardinia
2008 elections in Italy
April 2008 events in Europe